Urania Cove is the 1.6 km wide cove indenting for 1.35 km the west coast of Two Hummock Island in the Palmer Archipelago, Antarctica north of Buache Peak and west of Modev Peak.

The feature is named after Urania, the muse of astronomy in Greek mythology.

Location
British mapping in 1978.

Maps
 British Antarctic Territory.  Scale 1:200000 topographic map.  DOS 610 Series, Sheet W 64 60.  Directorate of Overseas Surveys, UK, 1978.
 Antarctic Digital Database (ADD). Scale 1:250000 topographic map of Antarctica. Scientific Committee on Antarctic Research (SCAR). Since 1993, regularly upgraded and updated

Notes

References
 Urania Cove. SCAR Composite Gazetteer of Antarctica
 Bulgarian Antarctic Gazetteer. Antarctic Place-names Commission. (details in Bulgarian, basic data in English)

External links
 Urania Cove. Copernix satellite image

Two Hummock Island
Coves of Graham Land
Bulgaria and the Antarctic